Chah Khargushi (also Romanized as Chāh Khargūshī) is a village in Sharifabad Rural District, in the Central District of Sirjan County, Kerman Province, Iran. At the 2006 census, its population was 66, in 15 families.

References 

Populated places in Sirjan County